The Foolish Heart (German: Das törichte Herz) is a 1919 German silent film directed by Erik Lund.

Cast
In alphabetical order
 Olga Engl 
 Eva May 
 Karl Platen
 Hermann Thimig 
 Leopold von Ledebur

References

Bibliography
 Hans-Michael Bock and Tim Bergfelder. The Concise Cinegraph: An Encyclopedia of German Cinema. Berghahn Books.

External links

1919 films
Films of the Weimar Republic
German silent feature films
Films directed by Erik Lund
German black-and-white films
1910s German films